Matthew Coon Come  (born April 13, 1956) is a Canadian politician and activist of Cree descent. He was National Chief of the Assembly of First Nations from 2000 to 2003.

Born near Mistissini, Quebec, Coon Come was first educated at LaTuque Indian Residential School, in LaTuque, Quebec, part of the residential school system. He later studied political science at Trent University, and law at McGill University.

Coon Come was first elected as grand chief and chairman of Quebec's Grand Council of the Crees in 1987. He became known internationally for his efforts to defend the fundamental rights of First Nations peoples, notably in the campaign against the Quebec government's James Bay hydroelectric project.

Awards and honours

Coon Come was awarded with a National Aboriginal Achievement Award, now the Indspire Awards, in 1995. He has also received 2 honorary degrees, including:

Honorary degrees

References

External links 
Matthew Coon Come, National Aboriginal Achievement Awards biography
Matthew Coon Come: Interview with Rex Murphy on CBC
About The Grand Chief
Matthew Coon Come • I choose to forgive

1956 births
Living people
Assembly of First Nations chiefs
Cree people
Officers of the Order of Canada
Trent University alumni
Indigenous leaders in Quebec
People from Eeyou Istchee (territory)
McGill University Faculty of Law alumni
Indspire Awards
Goldman Environmental Prize awardees